Sebastiaan "Bas" Bökkerink (born 23 October 1994) is a Dutch football player who plays for Quick '20.

Club career
He made his professional debut in the Eerste Divisie for Achilles '29 on 30 September 2016 in a game against VVV-Venlo.

References

External links
 

1994 births
Living people
Dutch footballers
Achilles '29 players
Eerste Divisie players
Quick '20 players
Association football defenders